Jörg Schäfer (born 17 July 1959) is a retired West German hammer thrower.

He finished fifth at the 1986 European Championships. He also competed at the 1987 World Championships without reaching the final. Schäfer represented the sports club TV Wattenscheid, and became West German champion in 1987.

International competitions

References

1959 births
Living people
German male hammer throwers
West German male hammer throwers
World Athletics Championships athletes for West Germany